Nucleoporin 54 (Nup54) is a protein that in humans is encoded by the NUP54 gene.

Function 

The nuclear envelope creates distinct nuclear and cytoplasmic compartments in eukaryotic cells. It consists of two concentric membranes perforated by nuclear pores, large protein complexes that form aqueous channels to regulate the flow of macromolecules between the nucleus and the cytoplasm. These complexes are composed of at least 100 different polypeptide subunits, many of which belong to the nucleoporin family. This gene encodes a member of the phe-gly (FG) repeat-containing nucleoporin subset.

References

Further reading

External links 
 PDBe-KB provides an overview of all the structure information available in the PDB for Human Nucleoporin p54

Nuclear pore complex